Tennis Krishna is a popular Kannada actor and comedian. Tennis Krishna has acted in over 600 movies and has a record of acting in 100 movies with comedy actress Rekha Das.

Life
His background is from Kannada theatre.

He acted with Kannada actor Dr. Rajkumar in the movie Jeevanachaitra. His first released Kannada, in a lead role for the first film was Appa Nanjappa Maga Gunjappa in 1994. After the success of Appa Nanjappa Maga Gunajappa  Tennis Krishna acted in many more films mainly in comedy roles Upcoming movies Bannada Neralu and Ondu Chance Kodi

Filmography

As actor  

 1990 - Raja Kempu Roja (Kannada)
 1991 - Meese Hotta Gandasige Demandappu Demandu (Kannada)
 1992 - Jeevana Chaitra (Kannada)
 1992 - Tharle Nan Maga (Kannada)
 1992 - Chikkejamanru (Kannada)
 1992 - Bombat Hendthi (Kannada)
 1992 - Kaliyuga Seethe (Kannada)
 1994 - Appa Nanjappa Maga Gunjappa (Kannada, in a lead role for the first time)
 1995 - Gadibidi Aliya (Kannada)
 1995 - "Mojugara Sogasugara" (Kannada)
 1996 - Dhani(movie)
 1997 - Ee Hrudaya Ninagaagi (Kannada)
 1997 - Cheluva (Kannada)
 1998 - Kaurava (Kannada)
 1998 - Thutta Mutta (Kannada)
 1998 - Preethsod Thappa (Kannada)
 1999 - Nannaseya Hoove (Kannada)
 1999 - Patela (Kannada)
 2000 - Khiladi (Kannada)
 2000 - Soorappa (Kannada)
 2001 - Diggajaru (Kannada)
 2002 - Yaarige Beda Duddu! (Kannada)
 2002 - Neela Megha Shyama(Kannada)
 2002 - Make Up (Kannada)
 2002 - Thuntata (film) (Kannada)
 2004 - Durgi (film) (Kannada)
 2005 - Maharaja (Kannada)
 2005 - Anna Thangi (Kannada)
 2005 - News (Kannada)
 2005 - Sirichandana (Kannada)
 2006 - Nidhi (Kannada)
 2006 - Hettavara Kanasu (Kannada)
 2006 - Road Romeo (Kannada)
 2007 - Parodi (Kannada)
 2007 - Lava Kusha (Kannada)
 2008 - Mast Maja Maadi (Kannada)
 2009 - Veera Madakari (Kannada)
 2009 - Chickpete Sachagalu (Kannada)
 2010 - Idre Gopi Bidre Papi (Kannada)
 2010 - Onti Mane (Kannada)
 2011 - 5 Idiots (Kannada)
 2011 - Uyyale (Kannada)
 2011 - Gavipura (Kannada)
 2011 - Kanchana (Kannada)
 2011 - Thaare (Kannada)
 2011 - Putra  (Kannada)
 2011 - Namitha I Love You (Kannada)
 2011 - Sri Naga Shakti (Kannada)
 2012 - Hara (Kannada)
 2012 - Bhagavantha Kai Kotta (Kannada)
 2013- Bulbul (Kannada)
 2014- Ekkasaka (Tulu)
2015- Ond Chance Kodi (Kannada)
 2015- Uppi 2 (Kannada)
 2016 - John Jani Janardhan (Kannada)

 As singer 
 2002 - Yaarige Beda Duddu! (Kannada)
 2002 - Neela Megha Shyama (Kannada)
 2009 - Veera Madakari (Kannada)

 Television 
2018 - Comedy Khiladi Championship'' - Zee Kannada

References

External links 
 

Male actors in Kannada cinema
Living people
Indian male film actors
Indian male comedians
21st-century Indian male actors
20th-century Indian male actors
Kannada comedians
1949 births
Recipients of the Rajyotsava Award 2005